Robby De Sá is a producer, songwriter, and multi-instrumentalist from Potchefstroom in South Africa. He attended Potchefstroom High School for Boys and North-West University.

Career 
Based in Sydney, he has worked with many artists, songwriters and producers including The Veronicas, MAY-A, Gretta Ray, Busby Marou, Mitch James, Tina Arena, Pamela Shayne, 5 Seconds of Summer, and Stan Walker. He (along with others) was reported to be one of 'Australia's most accomplished songwriters' in November 2013.

Credits

Discography

Performing credits

Early Career and Franklin 
Roberto Manuel De Sá (Robby) has been a professional guitarist since 1999 when he joined South African band 'Allegory' in Johannesburg, South Africa. In 2002, after the band completed a contract for Sun City International, he moved to Ireland with vocalist Gavin Edwards at the request of ex-Westlife member Brian McFadden and formed the band 'Franklin' with several other South African musicians. They were signed to Brian's own label (Pig Records) in Ireland. Robby co-wrote and released the single "You" in June 2004 which led to the Top 20 hit for the band in Ireland. Franklin performed at many of the Ireland's high-profile events such as Oxegen, Michelstown Festival and O2 in The Park. The band also supported Incubus at the Point Depot, Dublin in May 2004. As a session musician Robby has performed and toured with Enrique Iglesias, Il Divo, Westlife, Brian Mcfadden, Charley Pride, Shakin Stevens, Delta Goodrem and Ben Mills.

Vanda and Young Songwriting Competition 2013 
Robby was a co-writer of the song 'Paperthin' which placed second in the 2013 'Vanda & Young Songwriting Competition'

Only Lonely 
Robby co-wrote and produced the Tina Arena song Only Lonely (from her album Reset), which featured in a commercial for the 2013 season finale of Australian soap opera Home and away . The song peaked at No. 32 on the Australian Aria Singles Chart on 24 November 2013 and peaked at No. 14 in the Australian iTunes Store

References

External links 
 Official website

South African record producers
Male guitarists
Living people
1979 births
South African people of Portuguese descent
21st-century guitarists
21st-century male musicians